was a minor fudai Japanese domain under the Tokugawa shogunate of Edo period Japan, located in southern Mikawa Province (modern-day southeastern Aichi Prefecture), Japan. It was centered on Tahara Castle in what is now the city of Tahara.

History
Most of the Atsumi Peninsula was controlled by the Toda clan during the Muromachi and Sengoku periods. The Toda pledged loyalty to the Imagawa clan, but later came under the rule of the Tokugawa clan.  Following the Battle of Odawara in 1590, Toyotomi Hideyoshi assigned the Kantō region to Tokugawa Ieyasu and the Toda were dispossessed of their holdings, which were given to Hideyoshi's vassal, Ikeda Terumasa. The Toda accompanied Ieyasu to Edo and were reduced in status to hatamoto with a minor 5000 koku  holding in Shimoda in Izu Province.
 
Following the establishment of the Tokugawa shogunate, Toda Katatsugu was raised in status to 10,000 koku daimyō, and allowed to return to Tahara Castle, which was now the center of the newly created Tahara feudal domain  in 1601. In 1664, his son Toda Tadamasa, was transferred to Amakusa Domain in Bungo Province with an increase in revenues to 21,000 koku and Tahara Domain was reassigned to the Miyake clan, who remained in residence until the Meiji Restoration.

The domain had a population of 20,343 people in 4314 households per a 1696 census. The domain maintained its primary residence (kamiyashiki) in Edo at Hanzonmon. At the end of the Edo period, its holdings consisted of 34 villages in Atsumi District, Mikawa Province.

Although only a minor domain in terms of revenue, Tahara Domain had the distinction of being allowed a full castle, unlike most domains of similar size, which were allowed only a jin'ya, or fortified residence. Tahara Domain was noted for its domain academy and scholarship, and produced noted scholars such as Watanabe Kazan.

After the abolition of the han system in July 1871, Tahara Domain became “Tahara Prefecture”, which merged with the short lived Nukata Prefecture in November 1871, which later became part of Aichi Prefecture.

List of daimyō

References

External links
  Tahara on "Edo 300 HTML"

Notes

Domains of Japan
1601 establishments in Japan
States and territories established in 1601
1871 disestablishments in Japan
States and territories disestablished in 1871
Mikawa Province
Domains of Aichi Prefecture